Miravete is the name of several towns in Spain:

 Miravete de la Sierra a town in the province of Teruel, Aragón
 Casas de Miravete, a town in the province of Cáceres, Extremadura
 Miravet, a town in Catalonia